11th Anniversary Show may refer to:

EMLL 11th Anniversary Show
ROH 11th Anniversary Show